Samuel Hays may refer to:
 Samuel Hays (Missouri politician), State Treasurer of Missouri from 1871 to 1873
 Samuel Hays (Pennsylvania politician) (1783–1868), United States Congress representative for Pennsylvania
 Samuel Lewis Hays (1794–1871), United States Congress representative for Virginia
 Samuel P. Hays (1921–2017), American historian
S. H. Hays (1864–1934), mayor of Boise, Idaho from 1916 to 1919
Samuel Hays House, Boise, Idaho

See also
Samuel Hayes (disambiguation)
Samuel Ross Hay, American Methodist bishop